Ascott is a surname. Notable people with the surname include:

Les Ascott (1921–2013), Canadian football player
Roy Ascott (born 1934), British artist
Shirley Ascott (1930–1995), British sprint canoer
Percelle Ascott (born 1993), Zimbabwean-English actor

See also
Scott (surname)